Ayumi Hamasaki Arena Tour 2003–2004 A was released on September 29, 2004

Track listing

Opening
 Ourselves
 Real Me
 Angel's Song
 Fly High
 Teddy Bear
 Memorial Address
 Because of You
 Surreal, Evolution, Surreal
 No Way to Say
 Grateful Days
 Boys & Girls
 Unite!

Encore
 Moments
 Trauma
 Independent
 Flower Garden
 Who...

Ayumi Hamasaki video albums
2004 video albums
Live video albums
2004 live albums